Richard Francis Walls  (9 October 1937 – 30 October 2011) was a New Zealand politician and businessman.

Member of Parliament 

Walls was a Member of Parliament for Dunedin North from 1975 to 1978. A member of the National Party, he won the normally safe Labour seat as part of Robert Muldoon's landslide victory of 1975. He was the first National MP to represent a significant portion of Dunedin, a long-standing Labour stronghold, in 21 years. Walls was defeated after only one term by Labour's Stan Rodger; to date, he is the last National MP to represent Dunedin.

He made the initial five person shortlist, but after being hospitalised suddenly, he was too ill to travel to Auckland for the selection meeting.

Local-body politics
Walls was first elected onto Dunedin City Council in 1980. Prior to that he served on the St. Kilda Borough Council (1962–1965) and on the Otago Harbour Board (1965–1974; Chairman 1971–1973).  He was Mayor of Dunedin for two terms from 1989 to 1995, when he was defeated by Sukhi Turner. He was re-elected to the Dunedin City Council as a councillor in 1998. He remained a city councillor until 2010 and was chair of the Finance and Strategy Committee from 2007 to 2010. In the 2010 Dunedin local elections, he stood in the Central ward, but was unsuccessful.

Outside politics
In 2010 Walls was chairman of Dunedin International Airport Limited; a fellow of the Institute of Directors in New Zealand (FInstD) and a fellow of the New Zealand Institute of Management (FNZIM). He was a justice of the peace and was appointed a Companion of the Queen's Service Order for public services in the 1996 Queen's Birthday Honours.

He died suddenly in his Dunedin home on 30 October 2011 at the age of 74, and is survived by his wife June and three children.

References
 
 The Cyclopedia of Otago-Southland 1998

1937 births
2011 deaths
Mayors of Dunedin
New Zealand National Party MPs
New Zealand businesspeople
Companions of the Queen's Service Order
New Zealand jurists
New Zealand MPs for Dunedin electorates
Members of the New Zealand House of Representatives
Unsuccessful candidates in the 1978 New Zealand general election
New Zealand justices of the peace